Cost per lead, often abbreviated as CPL, is an online advertising pricing model, where the advertiser pays for an explicit sign-up from a consumer interested in the advertiser's offer. It is also commonly called online lead generation.

Contrary to cost per mille (CPM) and cost per click (CPC) pricing models, where advertisers are charged for impressions (a.k.a. "views") and clicks, respectively, in a CPL pricing model advertisers pay only for a qualified sign-up regardless of how many impressions or clicks their advertisement receives. CPL advertising enables advertisers to generate guaranteed returns on their online advertising money.

Difference between CPL and CPA advertising

In CPL campaigns, advertisers pay for an interested lead – i.e. the contact information of a person interested in the advertiser's product or service. CPL campaigns are suitable for brand marketers and direct response marketers looking to engage consumers at multiple touchpoints – by building a newsletter list, community site, reward program or member acquisition program.

In Cost per action campaigns (CPA), the advertiser typically pays for a completed sale involving a credit card transaction. CPA is all about 'now' – it focuses on driving consumers to buy at that exact moment. If a visitor to the website does not buy anything, there is no easy way to remarket to them.

There are other important differentiators:

 CPL campaigns are advertiser-centric. The advertiser remains in control of their brand, selecting trusted and contextually relevant publishers to run their offers. On the other hand, CPA and affiliate marketing campaigns are publisher-centric. Advertisers cede control over where their brand will appear, as publishers browse offers and pick which to run on their websites. Advertisers generally do not know where their offer is running.
 CPL campaigns are usually high volume and light-weight. In CPL campaigns, consumers submit only basic contact information. The transaction can be as simple as an email address. On the other hand, CPA campaigns are usually low volume and complex. Typically, consumer has to submit credit card and other detailed information.

CPL advertising is more appropriate for advertisers looking to deploy acquisition campaigns by re-marketing to end consumers through e-newsletters, community sites, reward programs, loyalty programs and other engagement vehicles.

References
The B2B Refinery by J. David Green & Michael C. Saylor
Lead Generation for the Complex Sale by Brian J. Carroll
Marketing Management by Philip Kotler
Database Marketing by Edward Nash
Marketing for Dummies

Pricing
Online advertising